Divo Airport is an airport serving Divo in Côte d'Ivoire.

Airports in Ivory Coast
Buildings and structures in Gôh-Djiboua District
Lôh-Djiboua